Still Unwinding is the seventh studio album by the English band The Rubettes. It was released on the Polydor label in October 1978, just seven months after their previous studio album Sometime In Oldchurch. It was the last album the band released in the 1970s - their next album Shangri'la, despite being recorded in 1979, was not released until 1992.

The album contained two singles, both released in advance of the album - "Goodbye Dolly Gray" and "Movin'".

In 1992, Dice Records (France) released the Rubettes' seventh and eighth albums (Still Unwinding and Shangri'la) as a double CD set.

Track listing
Side 1
"Movin'" (Tony Thorpe) - 4:05
"No No Cherie" (John Richardson) - 3:20
"Still Unwinding" (John Richardson) - 4:36
"New York Tower" (Alan Williams) - 4:48
"San Andreas" (John Richardson) - 3:32

Side 2
"Goodbye Dolly Gray" (John Richardson, Alan Williams) - 4:14
"Truth Of The Matter" (Alan Williams) - 4:02
"When Hays Was Young" (Tony Thorpe) - 4:18
"Do You Ever Think Of Me" (Alan Williams) - 4:20
"Does It Gotta Be Rock'n'Roll (Tony Thorpe) - 5:10

Singles
1.  "Goodbye Dolly Gray" b/w "Great Be The Nation" - June 1978 
2.  "Movin'" b/w "San Andreas" - September 1978

Personnel
Mick Clarke
John Richardson
Tony Thorpe
Alan Williams

Publishers
All tracks - Halcyon Music

Production and credits
Produced by The Rubettes with Alan Blakley for Gale
All tracks published by Halcyon Music Limited
Recorded at Le Chateau Studio France
Mixed at Advision and DJM London
Engineered by Mark J Wallis
Mastered by Mike Brown at Pye, London
String Arrangements by Gerry Shury
Design Art Direction by Alwyn Clayden
Photography by Chris Craske and Alwyn Clayden

References

The Rubettes albums
1978 albums
Polydor Records albums